First Church of Christ, Scientist, is an historic Christian Science church edifice located at 475 North Kingshighway Boulevard, corner of Westminster Place, in St. Louis, Missouri. Built in 1903–1904, it was designed as a stone building in the Classical Revival style of architecture by Edward Gordon Garden of Mauran, Russell & Garden and was the first institutional commission of that fledgling firm. Cost concerns, though, resulted in it being built of brick. It is a contributing property in the Holy Corners Historic District which was added to the National Register of Historic Places on December 29, 1975.

First Church of Christ, Scientist, which had been founded in 1894, still holds services in this historic building.

References

Christian Science churches in Missouri
Churches in St. Louis
Churches completed in 1904
Historic district contributing properties in Missouri
National Register of Historic Places in St. Louis
1904 establishments in Missouri